Kotturpuram is a railway station on the Chennai MRTS. Situated on the banks of the Buckingham canal, the station is accessible through Ponniamman Koil Road in Kotturpuram.

History
Kotturpuram station was opened on 26 January 2004, as part of the second phase of the Chennai MRTS network.

Structure
The elevated station is built on the eastern banks of Buckingham Canal south of Adyar river. The length of the platform is 280 m. The station building consists of 4,312 sq m of parking area in its basement.

Service and connections
Kotturpuram station is the eleventh station on the MRTS line to Velachery. In the return direction from Velachery, it is currently the seventh station towards Chennai Beach station

See also
 Chennai MRTS
 Chennai suburban railway
 Chennai Metro
 Transport in Chennai

References

Further reading
 Park near Kotturpuram MRTS soon, The New Indian Express, 13 Aug 2013, Chennai

Chennai Mass Rapid Transit System stations
Railway stations in Chennai
Railway stations opened in 2004